Jasper Roy Blackall (20 July 1920 – between 2018 and 2020) was a British sailor. He won a bronze medal in the Sharpie class  with Terence Smith at the 1956 Summer Olympics. He went on to form a graphic design company with Peter Cook and Rod Dew (Blackall, Cook and Dew) in 1961. Blackall was an illustrator and designer serving the advertising industry in London. Blackall died in Portugal sometime between 2018 and 2020.

References

External links
 
 

1920 births
21st-century deaths
British male sailors (sport)
Olympic bronze medallists for Great Britain
Olympic medalists in sailing
Olympic sailors of Great Britain
People from Hackney Central
Sailors at the 1956 Summer Olympics – 12 m2 Sharpie
Medalists at the 1956 Summer Olympics
Year of death uncertain